Jim Merkel (born 1957) is an American author and engineer, who moved from involvement in the military industry to advocating simple living. Since 1989, Merkel has dedicated himself to trying to reduce his personal impact on the environment and to encourage others to do the same.

Initially trained as an electrical engineer, Merkel spent twelve years designing industrial and military systems. After witnessing the devastation following the 1989 Exxon Valdez oil spill, however, he concluded that global problems had become so urgent as to require immediate action. He consequently quit his job and began a new career as an environmental activist and spokesman.  

He claims to have lived on $5,000 a year (close to the global median income) for 16 years (ca. 1989 – 2005), later increasing to $10,000 per year. He founded the Alternative Transportation Task Force in San Luis Obispo, California and served briefly as an elected officer of the Sierra Club; he conducts approximately 60 workshops each year on sustainable living and "radical simplicity" in the United States, Canada, and Spain.

In 1994 he received an Earthwatch Gaia Fellowship, allowing him to visit Kerala, India, and parts of the Himalayas to research sustainable living. In 1995, he founded the Global Living Project and continues to serve as its co-director. 

In April 2005, Dartmouth College appointed him its first Sustainability Director. He lives in Belfast, Maine.

Bibliography 
 Radical Simplicity Small Footprints on a Finite Earth (2003)

References
 Lois Legge, "Life on $5,000 a year: Merkel’s Radical Simplicity has included wearing same boots for eight years, growing own veggies", Chronicle Herald March 20, 2010

External links
 "Global Living Project" More information on Jim Merkel including his publications, workshops and other activities
 "RADICALLY simple" the 2006 film showing Merkel at work on his homestead as well as doing public presentations and leading workshops on footprinting, permaculture, money and other topics related to sustainability.
 "A radio interview with Jim Merkel at the Good Life Center in Harborside, Maine aired on community radio station WERU 89.9 from Blue Hill, Maine on the show Weekend Voices of 8/04/07"

Simple living advocates
Sustainability advocates
Living people
1957 births
People from Belfast, Maine
Dartmouth College people
Military industry
American electrical engineers